The José Monteiro da Costa Cup, also known as North of Portugal Championship (Campeonato do Norte de Portugal), was a Portuguese football competition established by FC Porto in 1910 to honour its president José Monteiro da Costa. Participating teams played against each other and were required to field an all-Portuguese squad. The winners would host the tournament in the following year, and the first team to win it three consecutive times would become the outright winners.

Porto won the competition in its first two years, but Académica de Coimbra prevented Porto's ultimate win in 1913. In the following year, Porto recovered the title at Académica's ground and won the cup definitely after securing their third consecutive win in 1916.

Editions

Performances by club

References 

Defunct football cup competitions in Portugal
1911 establishments in Portugal
FC Porto